. The Jovial Rascals of Edo, is a 1958 color Japanese film directed by Daisuke Itō.

The film won 1959 Blue Ribbon Awards for best actor Raizo Ichikawa and for best cinematography Kazuo Miyagawa. The film also won 1959 Kinema Junpo Award for best actor Raizo Ichikawa.

Cast 
 Raizo Ichikawa as Benten Kozō Kikunosuke
 Shintaro Katsu
 and others

References

External links 
  http://www.raizofan.net/link4/movie3/benten.htm
 

1958 films
Daiei Film films
Films directed by Daisuke Itō (film director)
1950s Japanese films